The 2021 Missouri Valley Conference men's basketball tournament, popularly referred to as "Arch Madness", was a postseason men's basketball tournament that completed the 2020–21 season in the Missouri Valley Conference. The tournament was held at the Enterprise Center in St. Louis, Missouri from March 4–7, 2021.

Despite the conference being the only conference to complete their entire conference schedule in the 2020-21 season, the tournament was marred by a positive COVID test in the Northern Iowa program prior to their quarterfinal matchup against Drake. Despite subsequent negative tests, contact tracing combined with St. Louis health protocols required UNI to forfeit the game advancing Drake to the next round.

Seeds
Teams were seeded by conference record, with ties broken by the overall record in conference games played between the tied teams, then (if necessary) by comparison of records between the tying institutions versus the top team in the standings (and continuing from top to bottom of standings, as necessary, with the team having the better record against that team receiving the better seed). The top six seeds received openinground byes.

Schedule

Tournament bracket

Postseason History Multiple Bids 

{|width="100%"
|-----
| valign="top" |

Notes

References

Missouri Valley Conference men's basketball tournament
Basketball competitions in St. Louis
2020–21 Missouri Valley Conference men's basketball season
College sports tournaments in Missouri
Missouri Valley Conference men's basketball tournament
21st century in St. Louis